The 2008 NBA playoffs was the postseason tournament of the National Basketball Association's 2007–08 season. The tournament concluded with the Eastern Conference champion Boston Celtics defeating the Western Conference champion Los Angeles Lakers 4 games to 2 in the NBA Finals. Paul Pierce was named NBA Finals MVP.

Overview
Thanks to preseason trades for Kevin Garnett and Ray Allen, the Boston Celtics entered the playoffs with an NBA best 66-16 record. It was also their first playoff appearance since 2005.

The Los Angeles Lakers entered their third consecutive postseason. Thanks to a midseason trade for Pau Gasol, they entered the playoffs as the top seed in the west for the first time since 2000.

The Phoenix Suns entered their fourth consecutive postseason. However, they lost to the defending champion San Antonio Spurs in the first round.

The Atlanta Hawks made the playoffs for the first time since 1999, taking the top seed and eventual champion Boston Celtics to seven games before bowing out.

The New Orleans Hornets made the playoffs for the first time since 2004 and for the first time as a member of the Western Conference. This was notable since this marks the playoff debut of Chris Paul and the Hornets’ first postseason appearance after Hurricane Katrina, pushing the defending champions San Antonio Spurs to seven games in the Conference Semifinals before bowing out. The Hornets would not win another playoff series until 2018, in which they were now known today as the Pelicans.

The Golden State Warriors won 48 games, more than 5 of the 8 playoff teams in the Eastern Conference. However, all eight qualifiers in the Western Conference finished with at least 50 wins, thus leaving the Warriors out of the postseason. 

The New Jersey Nets missed the playoffs for the first time since 2001, largely due to a trade that sent Jason Kidd to the Dallas Mavericks. The Miami Heat missed the playoffs for the first time since 2003, thanks to a league worst 15-67 record. It also marked the first NBA postseason since 2003 not to feature Dwyane Wade. The Chicago Bulls also missed the playoffs for the first time since 2004.

With their first round series victory over the Toronto Raptors, the Orlando Magic won their first playoff series since 1996. However, they lost to the Detroit Pistons in the Conference Semifinals.

With their first round sweep of the Denver Nuggets, the Los Angeles Lakers won their first playoff series since 2004 (when they last made the NBA Finals). It also marked the only sweep of the 2008 playoffs.

With their conference semifinals win over the Orlando Magic, the Detroit Pistons entered their sixth consecutive conference finals. The Pistons also became the first team since the Showtime Lakers to accomplish this feat. As of 2023, this remains The Pistons’ most recent series win.

Game 7 of the conference semifinals between the Boston Celtics and Cleveland Cavaliers became notable for a duel between Paul Pierce and LeBron James, who scored 41 and 45 points, respectively. The Celtics won this game and advanced to the conference finals.

With their conference finals win over the defending champion San Antonio Spurs, the Los Angeles Lakers returned to the NBA Finals for the first time since 2004. They also became the first top seed since 2003 to make the NBA Finals.

With their conference finals win over the Detroit Pistons, the Boston Celtics made the NBA Finals for the first time since 1987. As of 2023, Game 4 of the Conference Finals was The Pistons’ most recent playoff win.

For the first time since 2000, the top seeds from each Conference met in the NBA Finals. The 2008 Finals was also the first since 1998 to feature neither Shaquille O'Neal nor Tim Duncan.

The Boston Celtics played 26 playoff games (2 games short of a full length postseason of 28), breaking the 25 game record of the 1994 Knicks and 2005 Pistons by 1 game for the most playoff games in a single season played by 1 NBA team. The Knicks, however, only played a Best-of-5 First Round, and so had 2 fewer games to accomplish that feat.

Playoff qualifying

Eastern Conference
The following teams clinched a playoff berth in the East:
Boston Celtics (66–16, clinched Atlantic Division, and home court advantage throughout the playoffs)
Detroit Pistons (59–23, clinched Central Division title)
Orlando Magic (52–30, clinched Southeast Division title)
Cleveland Cavaliers (45–37)
Washington Wizards (43–39)
Toronto Raptors (41–41)
Philadelphia 76ers (40–42)
Atlanta Hawks (37–45)

Western Conference
The following teams clinched a playoff berth in the West:
Los Angeles Lakers (57–25, clinched Pacific Division title, and home court advantage for the Western Conference playoffs)
New Orleans Hornets (56–26, clinched Southwest Division title, winning conference record tiebreaker over Spurs)
San Antonio Spurs (56–26)
Utah Jazz (54–28, clinched Northwest Division title)
Houston Rockets (55–27, winning conference record tiebreaker over Suns)
Phoenix Suns (55–27)
Dallas Mavericks (51–31)
Denver Nuggets (50–32)

Bracket
This was the outlook for the 2008 NBA Playoffs. Teams in italics had home court advantage. Teams in bold advanced to the next round. Numbers to the left of each team indicate the team's original seeding in their respective conferences. Numbers to the right of each team indicate the number of games the team won in that round. The division champions possess an asterisk (*).

First round

Eastern Conference first round

(1) Boston Celtics vs. (8) Atlanta Hawks

This was the tenth playoff meeting between these two teams, with the Celtics winning eight of the first nine meetings.

Games 1 and 2 were Celtic routs, keyed by great team defense (Atlanta averaged 79 points in the first 2 games) and balanced Celtic scoring (six players were in double figures in Game 1, five in Game 2). The most buzz was generated by Mike Bibby stating that Celtic fans were bandwagoners after Game 1, prompting boos every time he touched the ball in Game 2.

In Game 3, Atlanta showed its athleticism with an array of dunks from Josh Smith (26 points) and a strong interior performance by the rookie Al Horford (17 points, 14 rebounds, 6 assists), who also jawed with Paul Pierce near the end of the game. There would be more jawing in Game 4 between Zaza Pachulia and Kevin Garnett, but the outcome was a surprise: thanks to fourth quarter heroics by Joe Johnson and Smith, who combined to score 32 of Atlanta's 34 4th quarter points, the upstart Hawks rallied from a 10-point third quarter deficit in Game 4 to tie the series going back to Boston. Boston dominated Game 5, but in Game 6, six Hawks players finished in double figures to force a winner-take-all Game 7. The Hawks were no match for the Celtics in Game 7, as the Celtics held them to 26 points in the 1st half. 3 minutes into the 2nd half, the series' tensions finally boiled over when Marvin Williams was ejected for committing a hard foul on Rajon Rondo. Then after that, Kevin Garnett was noted for trucking Zaza Pachulia while going for a screen.

(2) Detroit Pistons vs. (7) Philadelphia 76ers 

This was the fourth playoff meeting between these two teams, with the Pistons winning two of the first three meetings. The first meeting took place while the Nationals/76ers franchise were in Syracuse and the Pistons franchise were in Fort Wayne.

Misses down the stretch by Tayshaun Prince and Rasheed Wallace kept the Pistons from beating the Sixers at their home floor as Andre Iguodala grabbed clutch defensive rebounds to seize home court advantage. The Pistons responded with a blowout in Game 2. Game 3 was close at halftime, but Samuel Dalembert and Andre Miller helped to break it open with strong overall performances. Detroit was behind by 10 in Game 4 at halftime and in danger of falling behind 3–1 going back home, but three second-half 3s by Rasheed Wallace and strong showings by Tayshaun Prince and Chauncey Billups keyed an 18-point 3rd quarter turnaround which evened the series. Detroit dominated Game 5 behind Billups's 14 points and 5 first quarter assists, jumping out to a 14-point lead and never looking back. Richard Hamilton keyed a similar start in Game 6, scoring 13 points, as the Pistons took an 18-point first quarter lead and eventually rolled into the second round.

(3) Orlando Magic vs. (6) Toronto Raptors

This was the first playoff meeting between the Magic and the Raptors.

Scoring 25 points and grabbing 22 rebounds, Dwight Howard gave the Magic their first playoffs win since 2003 as they practically led the entire game. Howard put up 29 and 20 in Game 2, as Hedo Türkoğlu scored the final four go-ahead points to give the Magic a 2–0 lead. The Raptors would respond with a strong Game 3 victory keyed by great point guard play from T. J. Ford and José Calderón. But Jameer Nelson, Rashard Lewis and Keith Bogans keyed strong three point shooting in Game 4 and overcame Chris Bosh's 39 points and 15 rebounds to bring the Magic out of Toronto with a 3–1 lead. Howard finished off the series in Game 5 as impressively as he started–21 points, 21 rebounds, 3 blocks giving the Magic their first playoff series victory since 1996.

(4) Cleveland Cavaliers vs. (5) Washington Wizards 

This was the fifth playoff meeting between these two teams, with the Cavaliers winning three of the first four meetings.

LeBron James, labeled as "overrated" by Wizards guard DeShawn Stevenson, scored 20 of his 32 points in the second half to help the Cavs draw first blood in their third first round meeting in as many years. The Cavs and Wizards traded blowouts in Games 2 and 3, but Cleveland took a 3–1 lead in the Verizon Center off of Delonte West's last second 3. Washington stayed alive by winning Game 5 when Caron Butler converted a running shot with only seconds left, capping off his 32-point performance. However, James led the Cavs to a dominating Game 6 victory in Washington with a triple-double (27 points, 13 rebounds, 13 assists); he also received crucial outside shooting from Wally Szczerbiak and Daniel Gibson, who combined for 48 points.

This series was marked by several physical plays on James, with Brendan Haywood, Stevenson, and Darius Songaila picking up technical and flagrant fouls for hard contact on him.

Western Conference first round

(1) Los Angeles Lakers vs. (8) Denver Nuggets

This was the fourth playoff meeting between these two teams, with the Lakers winning the first three meetings.

In Pau Gasol's playoff debut with the Lakers, he scored 36 points, 16 rebounds, 8 assists and 3 blocks as the Lakers beat the Nuggets in Game 1. Kobe Bryant gave the fans a vintage performance in Game 2 by scoring 49 points and adding 10 assists in a blowout at Staples Center. The Nuggets were routed at home in Game 3, with Carmelo Anthony stating the team quit in the second half. Game 4 was closer, but Bryant led the Lakers with 14 points in the last 5½ minutes to sweep the Nuggets at the Pepsi Center. It was the first time the Lakers advanced to the second round since the 2004 season. The Lakers led at the end of every quarter throughout the whole series, only the seventh time that had happened in NBA history.

(2) New Orleans Hornets vs. (7) Dallas Mavericks

This was the first playoff meeting between the Mavericks and the New Orleans Pelicans/Hornets franchise.

In his playoff debut, Chris Paul scored 35 points, dished out 10 assists, and stole the ball 4 times to lead the Hornets to a comeback home win against the Mavericks. He would replicate that type of performance in Game 2 with 32 points and 17 assists. Dallas would come out with a dominant Game 3 performance at home after inserting Jason Terry into the starting lineup, but New Orleans would win the final 2 games of the series, keyed by David West in Game 4 and Paul's triple-double in Game 5.

(3) San Antonio Spurs vs. (6) Phoenix Suns

This was the ninth playoff meeting between these two teams, with the Spurs winning five of the first eight meetings.

Michael Finley made a game-tying three in regulation, Tim Duncan scored 40 points, including a rare three-point field goal to force a second overtime, and Manu Ginóbili clinched victory with a drive to the basket to break the 115-all deadlock with 1.8 seconds left to win a classic Game 1. Tony Parker would then pace the Spurs to their next two victories in the series, scoring 32 and 41 in Games 2 and 3 respectively. At the brink of elimination, Phoenix responded with a strong Game 4. But costly missed free throws by Shaquille O'Neal and key turnovers by Steve Nash helped San Antonio to prevail in Game 5, led again by Parker's 31 points.

Also notable was Gregg Popovich's use of the Hack-a-Shaq throughout the series to disrupt the Suns offense when Shaquille O'Neal was on the floor. O'Neal would shoot 64 free throws in the five games, making 32 of them.

(4) Utah Jazz vs. (5) Houston Rockets

This was the seventh playoff meeting between these two teams, with the Jazz winning four of the first six meetings.

The Jazz had a balanced game from Andrei Kirilenko, Carlos Boozer and Deron Williams to steal the home court advantage away from the Rockets. A similar performance in Game 2 put Utah in a commanding 2–0 lead going back to Salt Lake City. Rafer Alston's return to the Houston lineup after injury, along with Tracy McGrady's 27 points and Carl Landry's key block of Deron Williams helped Houston steal Game 3 on the road. Williams responded with a strong performance in a Game 4 victory, plus got some help from Mehmet Okur with his offensive rebound off of his two missed free throws. The Rockets controlled Game 5 to stay alive, but despite getting 40 points, 10 rebounds, and 5 assists from McGrady in Game 6 and 15 pts from Luis Scola, the rest of the team shot 10/39 from the field and could not overcome losing Alston to an ankle injury as the Jazz blew the game open with a 27–11 3rd quarter.

Conference semifinals

Eastern Conference semifinals

(1) Boston Celtics vs. (4) Cleveland Cavaliers

This was the fourth playoff meeting between these two teams, with the Celtics winning two of the first three meetings.

Although the Celtics had a quick turnaround from their unexpected seven-game series with Atlanta, they managed to hold off the Cavs by winning the first two games in Boston. Kevin Garnett scored 28 points and 8 rebounds and made the go-ahead shot in Game 1. LeBron James would only shoot 8 for 42 from the field in the first 2 games.

Cleveland would come back to win the next two games, Game 3, a blowout where five Cavs scored in double figures, and Game 4 where James would punctuate the victory with a dunk over Garnett. James's shooting improved in the return to the Garden in Game 5, but received minimal help from his teammates as Rajon Rondo, Garnett, and Paul Pierce all scored over 20 points to push Boston over the top. Game 6 was an ugly affair, with both teams shooting under 40 percent, but a 32–12–6 performance by James was enough. Boston, the best road team in the regular season, fell to 0–6 on the road.

Game 7 would end in a duel between Pierce (41 points) and James (45 points) that some compared to the Bird–Wilkins duel in the 1988 Eastern Conference Semifinals. But timely offensive rebounding (10 in all), 18 second chance points, and a few key shots from Celtics veteran P.J. Brown helped push Boston into the Eastern Conference Finals.

(2) Detroit Pistons vs. (3) Orlando Magic

This was the fourth playoff meeting between these two teams, with the Pistons winning two of the first three meetings.

The Pistons opened up with a rout in Game 1, as Detroit's big men keyed in on Dwight Howard and forced him to playoff lows 12 points and 8 rebounds, with five Pistons scoring in double figures. After being quiet in Game 1, the Magic's 3-point shooting picked up (11/26, with Jameer Nelson making 5-of-8), but could not overcome 19 turnovers and fell down in the series 2–0. There was a controversial call at the end of the third quarter, where Chauncey Billups made a 3 near the end of the 3rd quarter when the clock froze and approximately 0.5 seconds remained, but TNT clocks later revealed that Billups could not have gotten the ball off in time.

The Magic would take a 24–6 lead at home in Game 3 and use a 38–17 4th quarter to blow out Detroit; they were paced by 33 points by Rashard Lewis. Billups would injure his right hamstring early in the game and miss the remainder of the series, but they would not need him for Game 4 as Richard Hamilton scored 32 points and the Pistons came from 15 back in the 3rd quarter. Tayshaun Prince made the go-ahead basket with 8.9 seconds left and Hedo Türkoğlu missed a layup as time ran out.

Billups's starting replacement, Rodney Stuckey, struggled in Game 4, but came back with a strong Game 5. The Magic would outshoot the Pistons 48 to 36 percent, would make 36 percent of their 3s compared to 21 percent for Detroit, and outrebound them 46 to 38, but turned the ball over 21 times while Detroit had only 3. Rip Hamilton again led Detroit with 31 points, and Prince made the crucial defensive play by blocking Türkoğlu's layup in the waning seconds. Detroit advanced to their sixth straight Eastern Conference Finals, the longest Conference Finals streak since the Los Angeles Lakers went to eight straight in the 80s. As of 2021 this was most recent postseason series win by the Pistons.

Western Conference semifinals

(1) Los Angeles Lakers vs. (4) Utah Jazz

This was the fourth playoff meeting between these two teams, with the Jazz winning two of the first three meetings.

The Lakers took Game 1 in Staples Center, winning by 11 against the Jazz. After being presented with the season's NBA MVP award in Game 2, Kobe Bryant led the Lakers to victory with 34 points, 8 rebounds, and 6 assists. However, as the series shifted back to Utah, the Jazz responded, winning Games 3 and 4 behind the performances of Deron Williams and Carlos Boozer, who bounced back after two poor games in Los Angeles. The Lakers came back with authority as they took Game 5 with Bryant, Pau Gasol, and Lamar Odom scoring 20 plus points each. The Jazz looked to force a Game 7, but the Lakers did not trail and closed out the series in Game 6 with a 108–105 win at Utah, where the Jazz were 37–4 during the regular season. Bryant led the team with 34 points as the Lakers advanced to the Western Conference Finals, which they had not reached since 2004. This was the first playoff meeting between the two teams since the 1998 Western Conference Finals.

(2) New Orleans Hornets vs. (3) San Antonio Spurs

This was the first playoff meeting between the Spurs and the New Orleans Pelicans/Hornets franchise.

The Hornets, who earned the home-court advantage via winning the Southwest division, were able to gain a quick 2–0 lead over the veteran Spurs. But when the series shifted to San Antonio, the Spurs regained their edge, returning the favor in Games 3 and 4. Game 5 back in New Orleans shocked many as the Hornets played off the home crowd to a 22-point rout. The home teams were clearly dominating in this series as Game 6 was more of the same in San Antonio. However, that all changed when a much anticipated Game 7 saw the Spurs build a 15-point lead after 3 quarters, which proved to be enough (even after the Hornets cut the deficit to 3 with 1:35 left) to send them to another Western Conference Finals. The Spurs were the 4th team to win game 7 on the road after the home team won the first six.

Conference finals

Eastern Conference finals

(1) Boston Celtics vs. (2) Detroit Pistons

This was the eighth playoff meeting between these two teams, with the Celtics winning four of the first seven meetings.

Detroit walked into the NBA Eastern Conference Finals for the sixth straight season. Boston held off the Pistons in Game 1 88–79, but let Detroit rally a strong performance in Game 2 to win it 103–97 (marking Boston's first home court loss in the post-season). However, they let the Celtics win their first road playoff game 94–80 in Game 3. Game 4 saw the Pistons win 94–75, however they lost Game 5 106–102 despite a scoring run late in the game. In Game 6, the Pistons strolled into the fourth quarter leading 70–60, but a lack of focus, a poor game from Rasheed Wallace, and a rally-destroying turnover by Tayshaun Prince ultimately led to their demise, as the Pistons would end their season losing 89–81. With that, the Celtics moved on to the NBA Finals, and they would face the Los Angeles Lakers for the 11th time.

Western Conference finals

(1) Los Angeles Lakers vs. (3) San Antonio Spurs

This was the 11th playoff meeting between these two teams, with the Lakers winning seven of the first ten meetings.

The series pitted the two best teams in the Western Conference over the last 10 years. Having home court advantage, the Lakers started out as a favorite and did not disappoint their home crowd as they overcame a 20-point deficit in Game 1 and won behind Kobe Bryant's 27 points, 25 of which were scored in the second half. Game 2 was a cruise for the Lakers as they made a 9–0 run before halftime, led all game and built the lead to 30.

The Spurs easily took Game 3 at home with Manu Ginóbili carrying the Spurs after two terrible games at L.A, making 5 3-pointers and finishing with 30 points; Tony Parker and Tim Duncan added 42 more. In Game 4 the Lakers never trailed (the Spurs missed several opportunities to take the lead) and led comfortably late, but a furious run by the Spurs and several mistakes by the Lakers (Bryant attempting a running fallaway with plenty of time on the shot clock, Gasol missing 2 free throws) gave San Antonio a chance to tie or win with seconds left. On a disputed no-call, Derek Fisher jumped up and collided with Brent Barry, but no foul was called and Barry missed a last second 3. The NBA later ruled that a foul should have been called on Fisher when he collided with Barry.

Heading home up 3–1 in the series, the Lakers trailed in the first quarter by 17, but were able to cut the lead to six by halftime. Again, Bryant stepped up by scoring 17 of his 39 points in the fourth quarter, enabling the Lakers to surge ahead and seal the series, helping them to reach the NBA Finals for the 5th time in 9 seasons and the first time in the post-Shaq era.

The Lakers were able to reach the NBA Finals again as the #1 seed. The last time this happened to the team was during the 1999–2000 season, where they beat the Indiana Pacers 4–2. They also improved to 4–0 against San Antonio in the Western Conference Finals.

NBA Finals: (W1) Los Angeles Lakers vs. (E1) Boston Celtics

This was the 11th playoff meeting between these two teams, with the Celtics winning eight of the first ten meetings. These two teams in the same cities from Boston and Los Angeles it was the 2008 ALDS when the Boston Red Sox defeat Los Angeles Angels in four games.

Broadcast notes
The Playoffs began on Saturday April 19, with the Washington Wizards facing the Cleveland Cavaliers on ESPN. ABC kicked off its coverage with the Phoenix Suns facing the San Antonio Spurs. TNT's coverage began with a tripleheader on Sunday, April 20 in a game between the Toronto Raptors and the Orlando Magic, with the Denver Nuggets playing the L.A. Lakers on ABC in between. NBA TV has been broadcasting weeknight coverage of playoff games for at least the first round.
The Eastern Conference Finals were televised on ABC and ESPN, beginning Tuesday May 20 at 8:30 pm EST. Game 3 was scheduled to be televised on ABC—all other games are scheduled on ESPN. The last possible end date for the Eastern Conference Finals will be on June 1, if the series goes to a seventh and deciding game.
The Western Conference Finals were televised on TNT, beginning Wednesday May 21 at 9 pm EST. The last possible end date for the Western Conference Finals will be on June 2, if the series goes to a seventh and deciding game.
The NBA Finals were televised on ABC, beginning Thursday June 5 at 9 pm EST. The latest possible end date for the NBA Finals will be June 19, if the Finals goes to a seventh and deciding game.
ABC's lead announcing team for the NBA Playoffs (and, by extension, the NBA Finals) was play-by-play man Mike Breen, joined by analysts Mark Jackson and Jeff Van Gundy along with sideline reporter Michele Tafoya. Mike Tirico, Hubie Brown and Lisa Salters were the second team broadcasting on ABC. The latter, with the exception of Salters, were the lead broadcast team for ESPN Radio's NBA coverage, with Jim Durham and Jack Ramsay the secondary broadcast duo.
ESPN's other play-by-play announcers include Dave Pasch and Dan Shulman, along with analysts Rick Carlisle, Jon Barry and Doris Burke. Sideline reporters include Heather Cox, Holly Rowe and Ric Bucher.
TNT's lead announcing teams for the NBA Playoffs were Marv Albert with Reggie Miller and Kevin Harlan with Doug Collins. Play-by-play announcers Dick Stockton and Matt Devlin was also teamed with Mike Fratello and Los Angeles Clippers head coach Mike Dunleavy on a rotating basis. Sideline reporters include Craig Sager, Cheryl Miller, Pam Oliver, David Aldridge, Marty Snider, Dei Lynam, and Stephanie Ready.

Ratings
TNT's coverage of the 2008 NBA Playoffs was strong in audience delivery, with the playoff averages showing year-over-year growth among households (+15%), viewers (+14%), adults 18–34 (+25%), adults 18–49 (+22%), adults 25–54 (+24%), men 18–34 (+30%), women 18–34 (+5%), men 18–49 (+23%) and men 25–54 (+22%).

References

External links
 Official website of the 2008 NBA Playoffs
 ESPN's NBA page

Playoffs
National Basketball Association playoffs

fi:NBA-kausi 2007–2008#Pudotuspelit